The National Center for Research in Economic Education (NCREE) is a non-profit center located at the University of Nebraska-Lincoln in Lincoln, Nebraska, US.  Its primary function is to assist researchers and other organizations with research, assessment and evaluation projects in economics education.  The NCREE has designed, developed and revised widely used standardized test instruments for assessing the economics knowledge of students at various stages of education (e.g., Basic Economics Test (BET), Test of Economic Knowledge (TEK), Test of Economic Literacy (TEL) and Test of Understanding in College Economics (TUCE)).  The NCREE is home to REED, the Research in Economic Education Data Base.

External links
 National Center for Research in Economic Education
 National Council on Economic Education

Economics education
University of Nebraska–Lincoln